Ilnacorella is a genus of plant bugs in the family Miridae. There are about five described species in Ilnacorella.

Species
These five species belong to the genus Ilnacorella:
 Ilnacorella argentata Knight, 1925
 Ilnacorella insignis (Van Duzee, 1916)
 Ilnacorella nigrisquamosa Knight, 1925
 Ilnacorella sulcata Knight, 1925
 Ilnacorella viridis (Uhler, 1895)

References

Further reading

 
 
 

Miridae genera
Articles created by Qbugbot
Orthotylini